The Union Main Street Historic District comprises a primarily commercial portion of Union, Oregon, United States, including some civic and residential resources as well. The buildings of Union's downtown core and oldest residential neighborhoods recall the town's long and vitalizing, but ultimately unsuccessful, rivalry in the late 19th century with nearby La Grande to lead Union County in transportation, commerce, population, and government. Significant structures include many from Union's period of rapid growth from its early years through World War I (1870–1919), and a smaller number from the decades just after the town reached its zenith (1920–1940). The district was added to the National Register of Historic Places in 1997.

See also
National Register of Historic Places listings in Union County, Oregon
Abel E. Eaton House

References

External links

Historic districts on the National Register of Historic Places in Oregon
National Register of Historic Places in Union County, Oregon